Köpinge Church is a medieval church in Gärds Köpinge, Kristianstad Municipality, Scania, Sweden.

History

The oldest parts of the present stone church are from the middle of the 12th century, but remains of an older, wooden church have been found in the church. The broad west tower, the nave, chancel and the apse are the oldest parts of the presently visible church. The apse of the church is unusual in that it is comparatively richly decorated with pilasters dividing it into several sections. In the 14th century, a church porch was added in front of the tower entrance, and the interior was rebuilt during the 15th century, when the presently visible vaults were constructed. In 1560 a north transept was added, and in 1796 a south transept was also constructed. Renovations were carried out during the 19th century, when among other things the windows were changed. In the 1950s a large scale restoration was made under the leadership of architect . The church was restored again in 2009–2010.

Murals and furnishings
Both the nave and the chancel are richly decorated with church murals from the 1460s. The vaults in the nave contain pictures which tell the story of Genesis, while the chancel show the Last Judgment. Stylistically, the murals are related to those in Vittskövle Church.

Belonging to the church is a Madonna from the 1430s, made in Lübeck. The altarpiece of the church is from 1600 and made by Daniel Thomissen in Malmö. The baptismal font is from the 19th century and made of Carrara marble.

References

External links

Churches in Skåne County
Churches in the Diocese of Lund
Church frescos in Sweden
12th-century churches in Sweden